Vanashimakhi (Dargwa: Ванашимахьи) is a rural locality (a selo) and the administrative centre of Vanashimakhinskoye Rural Settlement, Sergokalinsky District, Republic of Dagestan, Russia. The population was 755 as of 2010. There is 1 street.

Geography 
Vanashimakhi is located 7 km southwest of Sergokala (the district's administrative centre) by road. Ayalizimakhi and Degva are the nearest rural localities.

Nationalities 
Dargins live there.

Famous residents 
 Rashid Rashidov (People's poet of Dagestan)
 Avadzi Omarov (Chairman of the Supreme Court of the DASSR)

References 

Rural localities in Sergokalinsky District